Nubnefer is the birth name of a king (pharaoh) who may have ruled during the 2nd Dynasty of Ancient Egypt. The exact length of his reign is unknown and his chronological position is unclear.

Name sources 
The name "Nubnefer" appears on two black stone vessel fragments found in the Southern Galleries in the necropolis of king Djoser (3rd Dynasty) at Sakkara, mentioning a building called "Menti-Ankh" ("Life may endure"), which was founded during the reign of king Nynetjer. Therefore, Egyptologists such as Peter Kaplony, Jochem Kahl and Francesco Tiradritti believe that Nubnefer's reign should be chronologically set close to that of Nynetjer. Nubnefer's name does not appear in any further contemporary or posthumous document.

Identity 
Egyptologists such as Battiscombe Gunn and Iorwerth Eiddon Stephen Edwards believe that the name "Nubnefer" could be the birth name of king Raneb. In contrast egyptologists such as Wolfgang Helck and Toby Wilkinson think that Nubnefer was the immediate successor of Nynetjer. Peter Kaplony identifies Nubnefer as a king who have ruled between the kings Wadjenes and Senedj.

References

External links
 Francesco Raffaele: Nwbnefer, Neferkara and Neferkaseker

28th-century BC Pharaohs
Pharaohs of the Second Dynasty of Egypt